Mamadou Gueye may refer to:

Mamadou Gueye (jumper) (born 1986), Senegalese long and triple jumper
Mamadou Gueye (sprinter) (born 1986), Senegalese 400 metres sprinter
Mamadou Gueye (fighter) (born 1992), French MMA fighter
Mamadou Gueye (basketball) (born 1993), Canadian basketball player

See also
 Gueye